Minden Vaughan Blake  (13 February 1913 – 30 November 1981) was a New Zealand flying ace of the Royal Air Force (RAF) during the Second World War. He was officially credited with destroying 10 enemy aircraft.

Born in Eketahuna, New Zealand, Blake earned bachelor's and master's degrees in science from Canterbury University College. In 1936, he joined the RAF after twice missing out on a Rhodes Scholarship and was posted to No. 17 Squadron. He participated in the Battle of Britain in 1940 as acting commander of No. 238 Squadron and then No. 234 Squadron, destroying several German bombers. He was awarded the Distinguished Flying Cross in January 1941. By mid-1942, he was commanding a fighter wing. He was shot down during aerial operations in support of the Dieppe Raid and became a prisoner of war. He had been awarded the Distinguished Service Order just a few days previously.

After the war, he continued to serve in the RAF in a series of senior posts until 1958. In civilian life, he was a prolific inventor and developed a golfing aid that was a commercial success. He died in 1981, aged 68.

Early life
Minden Vaughan Blake was born in Eketahuna, in the Manawatu District of New Zealand on 13 February 1913, the son of a schoolmaster, Charles Minden Blake, and his wife, Emma. He was educated at Southland Boys' High School from 1926 to 1929 and then Christchurch Boys' High School. He was heavily involved in sports, participating in cricket, soccer, and athletics. He would go on to become national champion in the pole vault in 1936.

Commencing his tertiary education in early 1932, Blake entered the Canterbury University College and gained a Bachelor of Science degree three years later. His father financially supported his studies by purchasing a chicken farm and Blake developed technology for grading eggs. After graduating in 1934, he progressed to graduate studies, studying mathematics. The following year, he was one of the college's two representatives for a Rhodes Scholarship. He was not selected and a subsequent attempt in 1936 was also unsuccessful. In the meantime, he had graduated with a masters of science with second-class honours. He spent much of 1936 as a lecturer in physics at the university and then applied to join the Royal Air Force (RAF), intending to study engineering in England once he completed flying training.

Military career
The RAF accepted Blake's application and he left for England in November 1936. He began his flying training late the following month at the Elementary and Reserve Flying Training School at Brough Aerodrome, in Yorkshire. He was granted a permanent commission in the RAF as a pilot officer in March 1937, at the conclusion of his course, and was posted to No. 5 Flying Training School at RAF Sealand. He gained his wings in June and was selected for training on fighters, learning on the Hawker Fury biplane. He completed his training a few months later and was posted to No. 17 Squadron, which operated Gloster Gauntlets from Kenley.

In September 1937 Blake was promoted to flying officer and became one of No. 17 Squadron's flight commanders. In March 1939, Blake received a further promotion, to flight lieutenant, and a few months later, the squadron moved to North Weald where it began converting to Hawker Hurricanes. He remained active in athletics, particularly in pole vaulting, becoming the RAF champion three years running from 1937 to 1939.

Second World War
On the outbreak of the Second World War, No. 17 Squadron was based at Croydon. A few days afterward, on 8 September, Blake suffered minor injuries in an aircraft accident. His Hurricane had suffered an engine failure during an attempted landing in the early evening and, overshooting the runway, he glided to a crash landing in the grounds of Purley Hospital. On his approach, the wing of his aircraft clipped the chimney of a building that Blake had been unable to see due to the fading light, which caused the Hurricane to flip as it landed. His head was gashed and he was heavily bruised. The engine failure was found to be the result of hay, from the cutting of the grass around the airfield, entering the air intake.

For the first several months of the war, the squadron flew defensive patrols, mainly from Debden and Martlesham Heath. In April 1940, Blake was sent to join the staff at No. 10 Flying Training School at RAF Ternhill, Shropshire; he acted as an instructor in the advanced section of the school. After four months, he was posted to No. 238 Squadron, based at RAF St. Eval in Cornwall, to take over as its acting commander. Taking up his new role on 16 August, his new squadron was part of No. 10 Group, which covered the south west of England.

Battle of Britain

Within days of his arrival, Blake destroyed his first enemy aircraft, a Junkers Ju 88 bomber, near Trevose Head on 21 August. A few days later he shared in the destruction of a Dornier Do 17 light bomber. In September, No. 238 Squadron moved to RAF Middle Wallop, in Hampshire. Being much closer to London, it began to be called upon to assist No. 11 Group in defending the southeast of England. On 14 September, he destroyed a Ju 88 over Brooklands in Surrey.

The following day, Battle of Britain Day, No. 238 Squadron was scrambled to help protect London from a large bombing raid. Blake led the squadron into an engagement with Heinkel He 111 medium bombers over Kenley. He claimed a destroyed He 111, which crashed on an airfield in Sussex. His own aircraft had been damaged in the attack and he made an emergency landing close by his victim.

Later that month, the original commander of No. 238 Squadron returned to duty. Blake, promoted to acting squadron leader, took over as commander of No. 234 Squadron. Part of No. 10 Group and operating from Middle Wallop, it had suffered a number of losses and had moved to Cornwall for a rest period. The operational tempo was much lower and it was not until 24 November that Blake helped shoot down a Dornier Do 215 bomber. At the end of the month, the squadron provided a covering escort for the destroyer HMS Javelin, damaged in an encounter with German destroyers, into Plymouth. German Do 17 bombers mounted an attack on Javelin but Blake shot down one bomber and damaged another.

Channel Front 1941–42
In January 1941, Blake's award of the Distinguished Flying Cross was announced. The published citation read:  Soon afterwards, the squadron moved to Dorset, where it was to operate from Warmwell. It began to re-equip with the Supermarine Spitfire Mk IIa and changed duties; instead of defensive patrols, it began to undertake offensive operations to occupied France and Belgium. On 11 March, he shared in the destruction of a Messerschmitt Me 109 and the same month was mentioned in despatches for his work as squadron leader.

Blake shot down a Ju 88 in May 1941, followed by a Me 109 just a few days later. On 10 July, while escorting Bristol Blenheims of Bomber Command on an attack on shipping at Cherbourg, the squadron was attacked by a formation of Me 109s. He managed to destroy two of these but his Spitfire was damaged by enemy fire in the course of the encounter and he was forced to ditch in the English Channel. His aircraft sank before he could extricate himself. He was able to kick free and on reaching the surface inflated his emergency dinghy. He drifted towards the Isle of Man for several hours before being picked by an Air Sea Rescue Services launch.

At the start of August, Blake was commander of a fighter wing made up of Polish squadrons, operating from RAF Exeter. His period in command was brief for on 21 September he was appointed wing leader at No. 10 Group's RAF Portreath. One of the last major engagements of the year for Blake was in October. He led a wing of Spitfires that was one of five such formations covering a bombing raid on St. Omer mounted by Blenheims. By this time, German defensive operations was causing high casualties among the RAF, which subsequently saw a reduction in these missions over the winter months. At the end of the year, he was promoted to acting wing commander.

Blake continued on operations for the next several months, leading his wing on long-range patrols as far as Brest but during this time was also involved in the development of a gyroscopic gunsight for fighters. This combined a conventional deflector gunsight with aspects of a bombsight. In August 1942, his award of the Distinguished Service Order (DSO) was announced, the published citation reading: 

A few days later, on 19 August, Blake led his wing in support of the Dieppe Raid. Taking off from RAF Thorney Island, they encountered a group of Focke Wulf Fw 190s. Blake destroyed one Fw 190 but was damaged himself. His canopy shattered from a cannon shell impact, and shards of perspex entered his eyes. He ditched his Spitfire in the English Channel, not far from the French coast, and took to his emergency dinghy. Despite the injuries to his eyes, he paddled towards England, helped by an outgoing tide. He spent nearly a day in the dinghy until he was retrieved by a German rescue launch and made a prisoner of war (POW). He was the highest-ranking officer of the RAF to be captured as a result of the Dieppe Raid and by this stage of the war, was credited with the destruction of at least ten enemy aircraft.

Prisoner of war
Because of the injuries to his eyes, Blake was hospitalised in France for three weeks before being transported to Germany by train. While in transit, he jumped from a window of the train but in doing so, he received injuries to a hand and lacerations to his head. He made his way to a nearby French farmhouse where he sought treatment. The owner of the farm, concerned for the safety of his family if the Germans were to discover Blake at his property, turned him over to the authorities.

Blake spent most of the remainder of the war at Stalag Luft III, a POW camp located near Sagan, in Germany. By 1943 he was the senior RAF officer in charge of the camp's Block 104 and it was in this capacity that he met Leonard Trent, a fellow New Zealander with the RAF who had recently become a POW. During their leisure time, Trent introduced Blake to golf, fashioning a home-made golf ball and scrounging a club for practice. In return, Blake taught Trent basic gymnastic techniques, going as far to construct a set of parallel bars. By January 1945, the Soviet forces were advancing into Germany and the POWs at Stalag Luft III were force marched away to the west to a camp near Bremen. They were moved again in April but were liberated by the British on 2 May.

Postwar career
In the immediate postwar period, Blake spent several months in New Zealand on leave. During this time, he met and married Molly, née Seldon, from Christchurch. He returned with her to England to resume his career with the RAF. In early 1946, he was posted to Fighter Command headquarters as a staff officer. He was presented with his DSO by King George VI in an investiture at Buckingham Palace in February. He was again mentioned in despatches in early 1947 and was shortly sent on a course at the RAF College at Bracknell. His following post was at Transport Command headquarters working on operational matters. He remained keen on golf; when his fellow former POW Leonard Trent, also assigned to Transport Command at the time, visited its headquarters he noted the presence of a practice pad in Blake's office. Blake resumed his pole vaulting career and was again RAF champion, in 1946 and 1948–1949. He was in the running to make the British track and field team for the 1948 Summer Olympics.

In 1950, Blake switched to personnel duties, this time for Bomber Command. A role at the North Atlantic Treaty Organization (NATO) followed, when he was posted to Oslo as Inspector-General for Northern Command, NATO. During his time in Oslo, he won Norway's Amateur Golf Championship. His final role in the RAF was at the Air Ministry, in a planning position. He retired from the military in January 1958.

Later life
In his return to civilian life, Blake began working as a manager in a factory that produced car wax. After several months, he moved to Swansea to take up a position in a textile factory. This did not last long and he settled in Surrey, working for a company manufacturing electronics. Blake was an inveterate tinkerer and at his home in Surrey constructed a workshop to indulge his hobby. He soon developed a golfing aid, the 'Swingrite', and this was patented in 1965. The aid was a commercial success and made him financially comfortable. He also published books on golfing technique and advocated a new style of golf swing. A few years later, he was granted a patent for a safety-belt mechanism for vehicles. In 1979, Blake was a co-author, along with H. J. Weaver, of Suicide by Socialism.

Blake died on 30 November 1981. There is a memorial to him at a building at Purley Hospital, where he crashed his Hurricane in the early days of the Second World War. The memorial includes a description of the accident.

Notes

References

1913 births
1981 deaths
People from Eketāhuna
New Zealand World War II flying aces
New Zealand World War II pilots
Royal Air Force wing commanders
New Zealand people of World War II
The Few
Recipients of the Distinguished Flying Cross (United Kingdom)
Companions of the Distinguished Service Order
Shot-down aviators
World War II prisoners of war held by Germany